John Cowley (1909–1967) was an English entomologist specializing on Odonata and Diptera. Born in Albourne, Sussex, he was elected a Fellow of the  Royal Entomological Society of London in 1931.

References

External links

1909 births
1967 deaths
English entomologists
20th-century British zoologists
People from Albourne